Christine El Mahdy (born Christine Margaret Bamford; 31 May 1950 – 7 February 2008) was an English Egyptologist and author. She lectured at Yeovil College and directed the Egyptian society.

Books 
 as Christine Hobson: Exploring the World of the Pharaohs: Complete Guide to Ancient Egypt. (Hardcover) Thames & Hudson, London 1987, .
Mummies, Myth and Magic in Ancient Egypt. Thames & Hudson, London 1991 (Reprint), .
Tutankhamun – The Life and Death of the Boy King. Blessing, München 2000, .
The Secret of the Great Pyramid. Deutsche Erstausgabe, 1. Auflage, Goldmann, München 2005, .

References 

1950 births
2008 deaths
English Egyptologists
British women archaeologists
20th-century British non-fiction writers
21st-century British non-fiction writers
20th-century English women writers
20th-century English writers
21st-century English women writers